Phyllostachys heteroclada, the fishscale bamboo, also known as "water bamboo", is a running bamboo.  The water bamboo name comes from the air canals in the rhizomes and roots that allow this bamboo to grow in more saturated conditions as compared to similar species.  This species can also have abrupt kinks at the base of the culms.  Maximum height can reach 35 ft with a diameter of 2 in.  It is cold hardy to around -5 °F.  It grows well in USDA zones 6b-10.

References

 
 

heteroclada
Endemic flora of China
Grasses of China
Taxa named by Daniel Oliver